Mikhail Markov is a Kyrgyzstani chess International Master.

Chess career
He played in the Chess World Cup 2013, being defeated by Levon Aronian in the first round.

References

External links 

Mikhail Markov chess games at 365Chess.com

1989 births
Living people
Kyrgyzstani chess players